"She (Didn't Remember My Name)" is a song and the debut single by Osmosis. It is the English version of "Vado Via" by Drupi. The song peaked at number 2 in Australia.

Charts

Weekly charts

Year-end charts

References

1974 songs
1974 debut singles